was a Japanese writer and illustrator of children's books.

Life
Yōko Sano was born in Beijing, China, on 28 June 1938. A writer of many talents, she produced numerous children’s books. She is particularly well known for her book, and movie, The Cat Who Lived One Million Times. She traveled to Europe in 1967 and studied lithography in Berlin. In 1973 she published her first picture book, Sū-chan to neko (Su and the Cat). She went on to produce various styles of picture books, including Ojisan no kasa (Uncle’s Umbrella), Watashi no bōshi (My Hat; winner of the Kodansha Award for Picture Books), and Nē tōsan (Hey Papa; winner of the Shogakukan Children’s Publication Culture Award). She also produced illustrations for others’ works and translated picture books into Japanese. Her script  (The Bicycle Pig Is Coming) was used in stage performances for children by the Maru theater company. She died on 5 November 2010.

She was married to the poet Shuntarō Tanikawa, and illustrated a volume of his poems: Onna Ni, translated by William I. Elliott and Kazuo Kawamura (Shueisha, 2012).

Awards
Medal of Honour with purple ribbon (2003)
Kobayashi Hideo Prize (2004)
Sazanami Iwaya Literature Prize (2008)

Selected publications
The Child Who Was Born (Umaretekita kodomo / うまれてきた子ども)
The Cat Who Lived One Million Times ( / 100万回生きたねこ) - now a movie
Hey, Papa (Ne, tosan / ねえ　とうさん) - won the Shogakukan Children’s Publication Culture Award
My Hat (Watashi no bōshi / わたしのぼうし) - won the Kodansha Award for Picture Books
Su and the Cat (Sū-chan to neko)
Uncle's Umbrella (Ojisan no kasa)

References

External links

Yoko Sano on Books from Japan

Japanese children's writers
Japanese women children's writers
1938 births
2010 deaths
Japanese children's book illustrators
21st-century Japanese women writers
Japanese women illustrators
Artists from Beijing
Writers from Beijing
20th-century Japanese women writers
20th-century Japanese artists
21st-century Japanese artists